Nuvva Nena is a 2012 Telugu-language romantic comedy film directed by debutante P. Narayana and produced by Vamsi Krishna under SVK Cinema banner. The film stars Shriya Saran, Allari Naresh, Sharvanand, and Vimala Raman in lead roles with Brahmanandam, Ali, Jeeva, Kovai Sarala, Srinivasa Reddy, and Narsing Yadav appearing in other significant roles. Bheems Ceciroleo composed the film's soundtrack with Mani Sharma providing the background score for the film. It is based on Hindi film Deewana Mastana.

Plot
Avinash is a small-time crook who creates havoc in the town of Amalapuram along with his friend Ali. After a big robbery, they escape to Hyderabad along with 100000 crores in cash. Unexpectedly, Avinash comes across the gorgeous Dr. Nandini, and it is love at first sight for him. He sets about trying to get closer to Nandini and starts hatching plans to that effect. Into this scenario enters Anand who is an extremely timid guy. Anand is extremely frightened about very minor things,

Friction develops between Avinash and Anand as they set about hatching plans to destroy each other's image in front of her. Unexpected competition comes in the form of local Don Aaku Bhai. After much drama, it is revealed to Anand and Avinash that Nandini is already in love with Raja when she invites them to their marriage. Although heartbroken, Avinash and Anand both move on in life after deciding to forget Nandini.

Cast

 Shriya Saran as Dr. Nandhini
 Allari Naresh as Avinash
 Sharvanand as Anand
 Brahmanandam as Aaku Bhai
 Ali as Chanti
 Kovai Sarala as Pushpa
 Jeeva as Inspector
 Srinivasa Reddy as Hotel Waiter
 Narsing Yadav as Narsing Yadav
 Prabhas Sreenu as Thopu Seenu
 Fish Venkat as Aaku Bhai's henchman
 Raghu as Aaku Bhai's henchman
 Raja Abel as Raja (guest appearance)
 Vimala Raman in a cameo appearance

Production
Nuvva Nena was the second film which had Allari Naresh and Sharvanand together after Gamyam (2008). The film is a remake of 1997 Deewana Mastana which had Govinda, Anil Kapoor and Juhi Chawla in the lead.

Release
The film was released on 16 March 2012.

Soundtrack
The audio of the film was released on 19 February 2012 through Aditya Music in the market. The launch of audio was held at Jayabheri Club in Hyderabad on same day. The soundtrack of the film was composed by Bheems Ceciroleo and its consists of six songs. Lyrics for the three songs were written by Krishna Chaitanya and remaining three songs were written by Bheems Ceciroleo, Anantha Sreeram, Srimani.

References

External links 
 

2012 films
Telugu remakes of Hindi films
Films scored by Mani Sharma
2010s Telugu-language films
2012 directorial debut films
Films scored by Bheems Ceciroleo